Don Antonio de Ulloa may refer to:

 Antonio de Ulloa, a Spanish general, explorer, author, astronomer, and colonial administrator.
Don Antonio de Ulloa, a Spanish Navy cruiser that fought at the Battle of Manila Bay during the Spanish–American War.